Lieutenant-General Charles Craufurd Hay (1809–1873) was a British Army officer who became General Officer Commanding-in-Chief, Cape of Good Hope.

Military career
Hay was commissioned as an ensign in the 19th Regiment of Foot on 27 June 1824. He became General Officer Commanding-in-Chief, Cape of Good Hope in December 1868, in which capacity he briefly acted as Governor of Cape Colony in 1870, before retiring in September 1873.  As acting governor he was sympathetic to the claims of the Griqua Chief, Nicolaas Waterboer, against the Government of the Orange Free State.

He was also colonel of the 58th Regiment of Foot and then of the 93rd Regiment of Foot.

References

|-

1809 births
1873 deaths
British Army lieutenant generals
Green Howards officers